Banana Slug String Band (BSSB), formed in 1985, is a children's band based out of Santa Cruz, California and are self-described as "Environmental Educators".

They focus on live performances at schools assemblies and music festivals. As of 2015, they were playing as many as 150 shows a year performing with costumes and as characters to deliver their environmental messages to children. The Slugs have performed at festivals including the New Orleans Jazz and Heritage Festival, High Sierra Music Festival, and Strawberry Music Festival.

As of 2019, they still consist of the original four band members. They have won three Parents' Choice Awards, most recently in 2011 for Only One Ocean, along with other awards. Some of their more well known songs are, “Dirt Made My Lunch”, “Too Hot”, and “Water Cycle Boogie”.

All four members have been teachers and see their band as continuing to educate children. BSSB has partnered with many groups in their career, including 30 different ocean conservation organizations that helped fund their album Only One Ocean.

They've released 12 CDs, along with live recordings.

Related acts

Larry Graff is also a member of Painted Mandolin, a Grateful Dead cover band.

Other ventures 
Doug "Dirt" Greenfield is a faculty member and program director for Venture West School of Outdoor Living and Exploring New Horizons, and has designed and led outdoors science camps in Northern California.

Discography

References

External links 

 The Banana Slug String Band- Dirt Made My Lunch music video
 Banana Slug String Band official YouTube channel

American children's musical groups
Musical groups established in 1985
1985 establishments in California